Emily Maher (born 2 May 1981 in Kilkenny) is a retired Irish athlete who specialised in the sprinting events. She represented her country at the 2000 Summer Olympics, as well as the 2006 World Indoor Championships.

Competition record

Personal bests
Outdoor
100 metres – 11.58 (+2.0 m/s) (Bedford 2000)
200 metres – 23.34 (-0.6 m/s) (Dublin 2000)
400 metres – 53.61 (2000)
Indoor
60 metres – 7.36 (Belfast 2006)
200 metres – 24.00 (Belfast 2003)

References

1981 births
Living people
People from Kilkenny (city)
Irish female sprinters
Athletes (track and field) at the 2000 Summer Olympics
Olympic athletes of Ireland
Universiade medalists in athletics (track and field)
Universiade bronze medalists for Ireland
Medalists at the 2005 Summer Universiade
Olympic female sprinters